National Highway 335 (NH 335) is a  National Highway in India.

References

National highways in India